Klyuchi (lit. springs) is the name of several rural localities in Russia:
 Klyuchi, Kamchatka Krai, a former town in Kamchatka Oblast; since 2004 — a rural locality; since 2007 — in Kamchatka Krai
 Klyuchi, Biysky District, Altai Krai, a selo in Biysky District of Altai Krai
 Klyuchi, Kamensky District, Altai Krai, a selo in Kamensky District of Altai Krai
 Klyuchi, Klyuchevsky District, Altai Krai, a selo in Klyuchevsky District of Altai Krai
 Klyuchi, Topchikhinsky District, Altai Krai, a settlement in Topchikhinsky District of Altai Krai
 Klyuchi, Tyumenstevsky District, Altai Krai, a selo in Tyumentsevsky District of Altai Krai
 Klyuchi, name of several other rural localities

See also
 Klyuchevsky (disambiguation)